Ericusa sericata, common name : the silk-like volute,  is a species of sea snail, a marine gastropod mollusk in the family Volutidae, the volutes.

Description
The size of the shell varies between  75 mm and 125 mm

Distribution
This species is distributed in the Pacific Ocean along Eastern Australia (Queensland, New South Wales)

References

 Bail, P & Poppe, G. T. 2001. A conchological iconography: a taxonomic introduction of the recent Volutidae. Hackenheim-Conchbook, 30 pp, 5 pl.

External links
 

Volutidae
Gastropods described in 1951